The Kalahari plated lizard (Gerrhosaurus auritus) is a species of lizard in the Gerrhosauridae family.
It is found in Angola, Democratic Republic of the Congo, Zambia, Namibia, Botswana, and South Africa.

References

Gerrhosaurus
Reptiles described in 1887
Taxa named by Oskar Boettger